Bijele Vode (Cyrillic: Бијеле Воде) is a village in the City of Zenica, Bosnia and Herzegovina.

Demographics 
According to the 2013 census, its population was nil, down from 85 in 1991.

References

Populated places in Zenica